Tough 'Duff is the second album by organist Jack McDuff recorded in 1960 and released on the Prestige label.

Reception

Scott Yanow of Allmusic states, "although no real surprises occur, the results are typically swingin' and groovin'".

Track listing 
All compositions by Jack McDuff except as indicated
 "Smooth Sailing" (Arnett Cobb) - 6:45    
 "Mean to Me" (Fred E. Ahlert, Roy Turk) - 5:38    
 "Tippin' In" (Bobby Smith, Marty Symes) - 5:22    
 "Yeah, Baby" - 8:52    
 "Autumn Leaves" (Joseph Kosma, Johnny Mercer, Jacques Prévert) - 5:12    
 "Tough 'Duff" - 7:00

Personnel 
Jack McDuff - organ
Jimmy Forrest - tenor saxophone
Lem Winchester - vibraphone
Bill Elliot - drums

References 

 

Jack McDuff albums
Jimmy Forrest albums
1960 albums
Prestige Records albums
Albums recorded at Van Gelder Studio